Acts 25 is the twenty-fifth chapter of the Acts of the Apostles in the New Testament of the Christian Bible. It records the period of Paul's imprisonment in Caesarea. The book containing this chapter is anonymous but early Christian tradition uniformly affirmed that Luke composed this book as well as the Gospel of Luke.

Text 
The original text was written in Koine Greek. This chapter is divided into 27 verses.

Textual witnesses
Some early manuscripts containing the text of this chapter are:
 Codex Vaticanus (AD 325–350)
 Codex Sinaiticus (330–360)
 Codex Bezae (c. 400)
 Codex Alexandrinus (400–440)
 Codex Ephraemi Rescriptus (c. 450)
 Codex Laudianus (c. 550)

Locations

The events in this chapter took place in Caesarea and Jerusalem.

Paul appeals to Caesar (25:1–12)

Porcius Festus as the procurator of the province of Judea after Antonius Felix was confirmed by first-century historian Josephus (Jewish War 2.271; Antiquities 20.182-8), and he was eager to clean up problems left by his predecessor as well as to avoid any actions that compelled the Jewish community in Caesarea to send a delegation to Rome complaining about Felix's 'misdeeds against the Jews' (Josephus, Antiquities 20.182). Therefore, in keeping a good relation with the Jewish authorities (verses 2, 9) and in acting with all propriety related to Rome, Festus' decision to refer the case to Rome (to Caesar as the final court of appeal for provincials) is understandable.

Verse 12
 Then Festus, when he had conferred with the council, answered, "You have appealed to Caesar? To Caesar you shall go!"
"(Porcius) Festus": the procurator of Judea succeeding Antonius Felix. His exact time in office is not known, with the earliest proposed date for the start of his term c. AD 55–6, while the latest is AD 61, but most scholars opt for a date between 58 and 60, based on a change in the provincial coinage of Judaea attested for Nero's fifth year points to AD 59.

Agrippa and Bernice (25:13—27)
Paul was almost set for the last journey to Rome as Festus has agreed to transfer his case to Rome (verse 12), but Paul had one more chance to make a defence of his case before the Jewish king Herod Agrippa II and his sister Bernice (verse 13), on the occasion of Agrippa's visit to Festus, and Festus's need of the king's expertise in drafting his report on the case (verse 27). Josephus records that Agrippa II (the son of Herod Agrippa I in Acts 12; Josephus, Jewish War, 2.247, 252) was a 'significant power-broker, both with Rome and with the Jewish community worldwide' (Jewish War, 2.245, Antiquities 20.135), acting as spokesperson for a Jewish delegation in Rome a few years earlier, and has a good relationship with Tiberius Julius Alexander, the prefecture of Egypt (Josephus, Jewish War, 2.309), who was a previous procurator of Judea and Bernice's brother-in-law. Bernice was the sister of Agrippa (and also of Drusilla, Felix's wife), currently a widow living at her brother's court (Josephus, Antiquities 20.145) and taking an active part in Jewish affairs (Josephus, Jewish War, 2.344). The Roman failure to find a case against Paul (25:14—27) and Paul's own self-defence (26:1—29) before Agrippa II are set to 'demonstrate the fulfilment of the prophecy that Paul would have to testify "before kings" (Acts 9:15)'.

Verse 27
 [Festus said to Agrippa:] "For it seems to me unreasonable to send a prisoner and not to specify the charges against him."

See also

 Related Bible parts: Acts 9, Acts 22, Acts 24, Acts 26

References

Sources

External links
 King James Bible - Wikisource
English Translation with Parallel Latin Vulgate
Online Bible at GospelHall.org (ESV, KJV, Darby, American Standard Version, Bible in Basic English)
Multiple bible versions at Bible Gateway (NKJV, NIV, NRSV etc.)

25